Haunted is the third studio album by the United States house group Late Night Alumni. It was released digitally on February 8, 2011 and physically on March 29, 2011 through Ultra Records.

Track listing

Includes "2 Days With Late Night Alumni" video

References

External links
 Haunted at Discogs

Ultra Records albums
2011 albums
Late Night Alumni albums